{{DISPLAYTITLE:C17H14N2O3}}
The molecular formula C17H14N2O3 (molar mass: 294.30 g/mol, exact mass: 294.1004 u) may refer to:

 Adosopine
 PHCCC
 Rosoxacin

Molecular formulas